The Arba'a Rukun Mosque, also known as Arba Rucun, is a mosque in the medieval district Shangani, Mogadishu, Somalia.

Overview
The masjid is one of the oldest Islamic places of worship in the Mogadishu capital. It was built circa 667 (1260/1 CE), concurrently with the Fakr ad-Din Mosque. Arba'a Rukun's mihrab contains an inscription dated from the same year, which commemorates the masjid's late founder, Khusra ibn Mubarak al-Shirazi (Khusrau ibn Muhammed).

See also
  Lists of mosques 
  List of mosques in Africa
  List of mosques in Egypt
Jama'a Xamar Weyne, Xamar Weyne
Awooto Eeday
'Adayga Mosque
Jama'a Shingani, Shingani
Fakr ad-Din Mosque
Mohamed Al Tani Mosque
Masjid al-Qiblatayn
Mosque of Islamic Solidarity

Notes

References

External links
ArchNet - Masjid Fakhr al-Din
photo of Arba'a Rukun Mosque in 1983

Mosques in Somalia
Buildings and structures in Mogadishu